Charles S. Ramson is a Guyanese politician. He is the current Minister of Culture, Youth and Sports in Guyana. He was appointed Minister on August 5, 2020, by President Irfaan Ali.

References 

Living people
Members of the National Assembly (Guyana)
Year of birth missing (living people)
Government ministers of Guyana
21st-century Guyanese politicians